Wrestle-1 Grand Prix was a professional wrestling tournament run by the Wrestle-1 promotion in Japan. It was inaugurated in 2015.

The tournament takes its name from a similar tournament done by the Wrestle-1 joint venture cards in 2005; however that tournament never finished, as the promotion broke up in October 2 of that year, before the semifinals could take place.

Results

List of winners
2015: Manabu Soya
2016: Manabu Soya
2017: Jiro Kuroshio
2018: Shotaro Ashino
2019: Daiki Inaba

2015 
The 2015 Wrestle-1 Grand Prix, was held from held from August 2 to August 30. The tournament featured 21-man single-elimination tournament The first two rounds were held on individual nights, with round one and The winner of the tournament get a shot for The Wrestle-1 Championship.

2016
The 2016 Wrestle-1 Grand Prix is scheduled to take place between June 15 and July 1.

2017
The 2017 Wrestle-1 Grand Prix took place on July 12.

2018
The 2018 Wrestle-1 Grand Prix took place on July 1 and July 18.

2019 
The 2019 Wrestle-1 Grand Prix took place on June 2 and July 2.

See also

New Japan Cup
Ōdō Tournament

References

External links

Wrestle-1 tournaments